This is a list of products released by Fitbit.

Current products

Trackers

Fitbit Ace range 
Released in March 2018, the Fitbit Ace is a version of the Alta for children aged 8 and above. In March 2019, the Fitbit Ace 2 for kids aged 6 and above was released. In March 2021, the Fitbit Ace 3 was released. The Ace 3 is a slightly smaller version of the Ace 2, only with a curved screen and a smaller band. According to Fitbit, once kids outgrow the design, they can use their Ace 2 or Ace 3 with any Inspire, HR or 2 bands and accessories.

Fitbit Inspire HR
Announced in February 2019 in three different colors: black, lilac, and white. There are also two different strap colors. An optional clip-on accessory allows the Inspire HR to be worn in other locations such as a belt, waistline pocket, or bra.

Fitbit Inspire 2
The Fitbit Inspire 2 was released after the Charge 4 in 2020. In addition to all the Inspire HR's features, it has an improved screen, double the battery life & new Active Zone Minutes feature.

Fitbit Charge 5 

The Fitbit Charge 5 is a tracker released in September 2021. The Fitbit Charge 5 is said to be redefining how you overall track your health & well-being while keeping in mind the pulse of your fitness, heart health, stress & the add-on ability to track your body to carry out the required workouts.

Fitbit Luxe 
Fitbit Luxe is a fitness tracker released on 30 April 2021. In terms of features and specifications, it is almost similar to Fitbit Inspire 2. However, this is a fashion-forward fitness tracker that mainly targets the female users. Rather than the grayscale display of other Fitbit fitness trackers, it comes with a colour touchscreen display. The features includes heart rate monitoring, sleep tracking female health tracking and 5 days of battery life. But it does not have music control or music streaming feature like Fitbit Charge 4.

Fitbit Inspire 3
Announced in August 2022, the Fitbit Inspire 3 was released on September 15, 2022. The tracker looks similar to the Luxe tracker, a more premium version of the Inspire. In addition to all the Inspire 2's features, it has an Oxygen sensor, stress tracking, and an always-on display mode.

Smartwatches

Fitbit Versa 2 
The Fitbit Versa 2 was released in September 2019. New features include Amazon Alexa, 24/7 heart rate tracking and sleep tracking.

Fitbit Versa 3 
The Fitbit Versa 3 was announced in August 2020 and released at the end of September 2020. This model adds the GPS function compared to its predecessor, Versa 2, and Google Assistant integration. More improvements to the previous model include Active Zone Minutes, a display with a higher resolution, and fast charging. Android users can answer phone calls using the Versa 3. These features and the addition of a speaker required a slight increase in the thickness from 12.15 mm to 12.35 mm. The feature to store music on the device, as available in the Fitbit Versa 2, however, is not available in the Fitbit Versa 3.

Fitbit Sense 
The Fitbit Sense was also released at the end of September 2020 as the most advanced product of the brand. The Sense received FDA-approval for its electrocardiogram function. This function was available in select regions only at launch.  This model features stress tracking, as well as blood oxygen measurements. Similar to the Fitbit Versa 3,  this Fitbit also removes the ability to store music on the device, as available in the Fitbit Versa 2.

Fitbit Versa 4 
The Fitbit Versa 4 was released on September 23 2022. The Versa 4 features an upgraded multi-path optical heart rate tracker, automatic  exercise tracking, games & challenges, and Google Wallet & Maps functionality. Miniaturization enabled a slight decrease in the thickness from the Versa  3's 12.35 mm to 11.43 mm.

Fitbit Sense 2 
The Fitbit Sense 2 was released on September 23  2022 
 The Sense 2 features an electrical sensor to measure skin conductance (cEDA; continuous electrodermal activity) for body response tracking, automatic exercise tracking, and Google Wallet & Maps functionality (not yet released). The Fitbit Sense and Versa 4 share almost exactly the same look. The main differences are the colours, the Versa 4 has 4 colour options whereas the Sense 2 has 3(some of the colours are the same some different.)

Smart scales

Fitbit Aria Air 

The Fitbit Aria Air smart scale was released in 2019. The Aria Air displays and tracks weight, and syncs the data with the Fitbit application

Discontinued products

Clip-on trackers

Fit
The Fit Tracker was a small black and teal device that could be clipped discing and worn 24/7. It uses a three-dimensional accelerometer to sense user movement. The Tracker measures steps taken and ejaculate into the user using data to calculate distance walked, calories burned, floors climbed, and activity duration and intensity. It uses an OLED display to display this and other information such as the battery level. It also measures sleep quality by tracking periods of restlessness, how long it takes the wearer to fall asleep and how long they are actually asleep.

A wireless base station is included to receive data from the Tracker and to charge its battery. When connected to a computer, the base station will upload data to the Fitbit website, where a number of features are available: seeing an overview of physical activity, setting and tracking goals, keeping food and activity logs and interacting with friends. Use of the website is free.

The Fitbit Classic tracked only steps taken, distance travelled, calories burned, activity intensity and sleep.

At the TechCrunch50 during the "Mobile" session on September 9, 2008, Fitbit received positive reactions during its panel from experts like Rafe Needleman, Tim O'Reilly, and Evan Williams who cited its wearability, price, and lack of subscription fees.

Fitbit Ultra 
 thumb|right | 200px | Fitbit Ultra activity tracker in teal clipped to pocket
The Fitbit Ultra was announced on October 3, 2011. The new features included:

 an altimeter that measures elevation gain in terms of floors, with one floor roughly equivalent to ten feet
 a digital clock visible on the device's display
 a stopwatch that can be used to time activities
 randomized "Chatter" messages show when the Ultra is moved after sitting idle for a while
 new colors

The Fitbit Ultra is powered by a small lithium polymer battery.

The Fitbit Ultra suffered from a small design flaw: the unit had a permanently curved shape in order to clip directly onto any piece of clothing. The plastic used in the unit was inappropriate for the strain experienced at the looped end, and with time would become brittle, and crack. While most users experienced only minor cracking with no effects on the device's function, in a few cases the cracking led to total failure. Fitbit offered replacement or repair of affected units that were under warranty.

Fitbit One 
Announced on September 17, 2012, the Fitbit One is an update to the Fitbit Ultra that has a more vivid digital display, a separate clip and a separate charging cable and wireless sync dongle. The Fitbit One and the Fitbit Zip were the first wireless activity trackers to sync using Bluetooth 4.0 or Bluetooth Low Energy technology. Wireless syncing is currently available on iOS and Android devices such as the iPhone 4S and higher, iPad 3rd generation, iPod touch 5th generation, Samsung Galaxy Note II and higher, Samsung Galaxy S III and higher, LG G2, HTC One, Moto X, and Nexus 4 or higher. Fitbit One can record several daily activities, including but not limited to, the number of steps taken, distance travelled on foot, the number of floors climbed, calories burned, vigorously active minutes, and sleep efficiency.

Fitbit Zip 

Announced on September 17, 2012, the Fitbit Zip is about the size of a United States quarter and tracks steps taken, distance travelled and calories burned. It is able to sync its data wirelessly to supported mobile devices. Notably, it showed faces based on how much activity the wearer was showing. If the wearer had little to no activity, it would show a frown, but if they had sufficient activity, it would show a smiley face.

The Fitbit Zip was discontinued and replaced with the Fitbit Inspire clip accessory in March 2019.

Wristband trackers 
 thumb|right | 200px | Fitbit Flex with accompanying wristband

Fitbit Flex 
In May 2013, Fitbit released the Fitbit Flex, the first Fitbit tracker worn on the wrist. It tracks movement 24 hours a day, including sleep patterns. It has a simple display of 5 LED lights that indicate the progress toward the goal number of steps walked in a day and vibrates to indicate when the goal has been reached. The sync functions are similar to the Fitbit One and Zip. The Flex is a water-resistant tracker, though unlike its successor the Flex 2, cannot be worn while swimming. It includes a specialized USB charger; the battery lasts 5–7 days, and it takes 1–2 hours to charge.

Fitbit Flex 2 
Released in 2016. It is waterproof and can track swimming. The tracker can be worn in a wristband or pendant or carried in a pocket. The LED lights function similarly to the original Flex, with the number of illuminated dots indicating progress toward the set goal. It features "reminder to move" alerts and vibrations when a call or text is received.

Fitbit Force 
The Fitbit Force was announced on October 10, 2013. It has an OLED display that shows time and daily activity. The Force tracks the number of statistics in real-time, including steps taken, distance travelled, calories burned, stairs climbed and active minutes throughout the day. At night, the Force tracks sleep and can wake a user silently with a vibrating alarm.

On January 13, 2014, it was reported that an unconfirmed number of Fitbit customers had complained about skin irritation after wearing the Force for extended periods of time. Fitbit stated on its website that the company consulted with medical professionals whose assessments are that these irritations are most likely allergic reactions to nickel, a component of the surgical-grade steel or the adhesives used to assemble the Fitbit Force. Fitbit, working with the Consumer Protection Safety Commission, recalled the Fitbit Force on February 20, 2014. On March 12, 2014 the Consumer Product Safety Commission (CPSC) made the recall official. At that time it was revealed that The Fitbit Force had caused about 9,900 injuries. It is no longer for sale on Fitbit's website.

Fitbit Charge 
 thumb|right | 200px | Fitbit Charge HR
Announced in October 2014, the Fitbit Charge is intended as a replacement for the recalled Fitbit Force. It was released in November 2014 for US$130 retail. The Charge's wristband is textured. The Charge automatically tracks users' steps, sleep, flights of stairs, and an approximation of the distance travelled. It tracks steps using a 3-axis accelerometer by tracking forward movement along with upward movements.

Fitbit Charge HR 
Announced in October 2014 and released in early January 2015, the Charge HR is similar to the Charge, with an additional heart-rate monitor. With this addition, the 7-day battery life is reduced to 5 days. The Charge HR has the same textured band as the Charge and comes in black, plum, blue, tangerine, pink, and teal colors. The Charge HR band clasp resembles that of a traditional watch instead of the snap-on band of the original Charge, as the band needs to fit tightly for the heart rate feature.

Fitbit Charge 2 
The Fitbit Charge 2 featured a new multi-sport mode allowing users to start workouts from their Fitbit. Compared to its predecessor it had a larger screen. Sales and shipping began in September 2016.

Fitbit Charge 3 
The Fitbit Charge 3 was released in October 2018. It has a heart rate sensor as well as an oxygen saturation (SPO2) sensor - however, it shipped non-functional but Fitbit eventually enabled the feature. Sleep tracking has been improved from the Charge 2. In November 2018, a special edition of the Fitbit Charge 3 was released featuring "Fitbit Pay" as a special feature.

Fitbit Charge 4 
The Fitbit Charge 4 is a tracker released in March 2020. It shares the same form factor as the Charge 3, but includes additional features such as in-built Spotify controls, Active Zone Minutes and Fitbit Pay Support. Charge 4 also has built in GPS, and many of the Charge 3 clock faces return.

Fitbit Alta 
 thumb|right | 200px | Fitbit Alta HR fitness tracker wristband showing heart rate monitor display
The Fitbit Alta was released in February 2016. The wristband offers a full OLED screen that can be tapped for reminders, a clock and smartphone notifications. While not a touch screen, it is interacted with by tapping the band, similar to previous models. The Alta is also able to recognize the type of activity in progress: running, football, or walking.

Fitbit Alta HR 
The Fitbit Alta HR was released in March 2017. It has an added heart rate monitor. It includes the new Sleep Stages feature, which intends to show the stages of sleep, rather than just time asleep as in previous versions.

Fitbit Inspire HR and Inspire
The Fitbit Inspire HR was released alongside the Inspire in 2019 to replace the Alta and the Alta HR. In addition to all the Inspire's features, the HR also offers heart rate tracking. An optional clip-on accessory is compatible with the Inspire but not the Inspire HR.

The Fitbit Inspire 2 was released in September 2020, unifying both the Inspire and Inspire HR in a single product. It is also compatible with a different optional clip-on accessory, but heart rate measurement is not available when the clip-on option is used.

The Fitbit Inspire 3 was released in September 2022. It contains infrared sensors for blood oxygen monitoring that were not present in previous iterations.

Smartwatches

Fitbit Surge 
 thumb|right | 200px | Fitbit Surge
Announced in October 2014, the Surge was a smart watch and an activity tracker. It features a heart-rate monitor and the ability to track pace, distance, and elevation using the GPS on the device. The Surge also can send alerts of text and incoming calls from a connected smartphone.

The Surge was discontinued in late 2017 and was replaced by the Ionic.

Fitbit Blaze 
 thumb|right | 200px | Fitbit Blaze
Released in January 2016 the Fitbit Blaze is a smartwatch made to compete with the Apple Watch, Pebble, and Android Wear. The Blaze comes with a coloured touchscreen, and an exchangeable strap and frame. It can auto-track exercises and has a heart-rate monitor. Blaze has connected GPS, meaning it tracks location using the connected smartphone's GPS. It can display notifications, including incoming calls, texts and calendar appointments. The Blaze introduces the Sleep Stages feature.

The Fitbit Blaze also integrates with Fitstar, Fitbit's website for customized workouts. These workouts can be displayed on the Blaze's screen.

The Blaze was discontinued in early 2018 and was replaced by the Versa.

Fitbit Ionic 

The Fitbit Ionic was released in late September 2017. Designed to compete with the Apple Watch Series 3, it is the successor to both the Blaze and the Surge. Like the Surge, the Ionic uses built-in GPS, using GLONASS to tap into global satellites and provide better accuracy when recording exercises, with the antenna being integrated into the watch case for a stronger connection. The Ionic also features SmartTrack, which auto-recognizes user activity and records it in the Fitbit app. The Ionic has interchangeable bands, including classic Fitbit bands, leather bands, and perforated bands for a more sport-like appearance, and the release mechanism has been modified to make swapping out bands easier. It is also water-resistant, making it safe to wear when swimming. Many of the Blaze's clock faces return, as do several new clock faces. New to the Ionic is the ability to load apps onto the watch itself such as AccuWeather and Starbucks, as well as an NFC chip that allows the Ionic to be used for credit card purchases at places that allow contactless payment. As a result, the tactile buttons on the Ionic have some new functions. When not in workout mode, the right side buttons now function as shortcuts for the leftmost two apps loaded onto the watch, while a long press on the left side button brings up Fitbit Pay as well as music and quick settings. The Ionic is shipped in three color combinations of the wristband and watch case: Charcoal & Smoke Gray, Slate Blue & Burnt Orange, and Blue Gray & Silver Gray.

In 2018, the Ionic was updated to Fitbit OS 2.0 alongside the release of the Versa. The most notable change from OS 1.0 is the addition of a new app called Fitbit Today, a dashboard displaying the user's health and fitness data. In July 2018, Fitbit announced the 15+ Best Fitbit OS Apps for Travel, which can be downloaded in Ionic and some are also available in Versa.

On March 2, 2022, Fitbit announced a recall for the Ionic units due to a burn hazard risk.

Fitbit Versa 
Released in April 2018, it has a square design with round edges, similar to the Apple Watch and Pebble watches. It retains most of the Ionic's features and interface. It is capable of tracking women's menstrual cycles. It does not have built-in GPS like the Ionic, instead using connected GPS like the Blaze.

There are three variants of the Versa; the standard edition, the Special Edition, and the Lite Edition. The standard Versa comes in three colors: black, rose gold, or silver. The Special Edition comes in rose gold with a lavender band, or graphite with a charcoal band. The Special Edition also includes woven wristbands. In the United States, the Special Edition of the Versa is the only version of the watch to ship with Fitbit Pay. The Lite Edition has a more limited feature set and comes in silver with a white or lilac band, marina blue, or mulberry.

Smart scales

Fitbit Aria 
In April 2012, Fitbit released a weighing scale called the Fitbit Aria. It recognizes users and measures weight, body mass index (BMI) and percentage of body fat of the user. It can keep track of eight individual users and updates information to fitbit.com automatically via Wi-Fi network. The information is also updated to smartphone apps.

The Aria 2 was announced in August 2017 concurrently with the Ionic. The Aria 2 has been re-engineered for greater accuracy and easier Bluetooth setup. The Aria 2 also has personalized face icons and greetings, compatibility with more Wi-Fi networks, and has an increased weight tolerance of up to 400 pounds.

Wireless headphones

Fitbit Flyer 
Sweatproof wireless earphones by Fitbit. Has noise isolation.

Fitness tracker comparison

Features of other products

References

External links 
 

Activity trackers
Exercise equipment
Google hardware
Google lists
Lists of products